Kundan Group was established in 1971 and is headquartered in New Delhi, India. The company has a multi-business portfolio inclusive of gold refinery, cosmetics, chemicals, polymers, agro-commodities, precious metals, petroleum products, energy, and the import of bullion and pharmaceutical items.

History 
Pradeep Garg is the founder and the chairman of Kundan Group. He founded the company as a small scale unit and expanded it into a multi-faceted business in over four decades. The board of directors includes Udit Garg, Vidit Garg, and Deepak Gupta.

In 1990, Kundan Group became accredited as the first star export house in India. It became the Direct Clearing member of National Commodities and Derivatives Exchange (NCDEX) and Multi Commodity Exchange (MCX). It was recognized as the Premier Trading House, the highest accreditation by the Government of India in 2009. Five years later, in 2014, it became recognized as the largest private gold refinery in India, followed by a National Accreditation Board for Testing and Calibration Laboratories (NABL) accreditation for its Gold refinery testing lab.

Kundan Group headquarter is in New Delhi, India. With a reported turnover of 4 billion USD, it is recognized as a Four Star Trading House by the Government of India, and it is an ISO 9001 certified company.

Companies 
Kundan Group is the umbrella company that operates various other companies:

Gold Refinery

Established in 2011, it is the largest private sector gold refinery in India. The company mines and produces gold and silver bullion through globally adopted refining technologies, inclusive of testing methods such as precise assay, fire assay, and XRF machine analysis. The gold refinery has NABL accreditation and BIS Hallmark. In 2020, Kundan Gold Refinery's gold bars were accepted for delivery on the National Stock Exchange (NSE) platform.

Minting 
The refinery is engaged in refining, designing, and manufacturing of precious metals in the form of coins and bars with purity up to 99.99%. It is the largest private gold refinery in India; it is accredited with National Accreditation Board for Testing and Calibration Laboratories (NABL) and with BIS Hallmark to ensure 100% authenticity to coins and bars.

Alainne 
Kundan Group started the Alainne brand in early 2010s, and the products are available on both online and offline retail channels like Flipkart, Amazon, and Paytm. Bollywood actress Tisca Chopra is the brand ambassador of one of their product line, Alainne room fresheners.

Rice Mills

Established in 1971, Kundan Rice is one of the oldest rice miller and exporter of basmati rice in over 35 countries. The company exports to the major seaports in Europe, Middle East, Africa, and America, and has three rice mills in Panipat, India. The milling capacity is of 20 tons per hour.

Zeya

In 2019, Kundan Group collaborated with Swarovski to launch Zeya by Kundan, a jewelry brand selling handcrafted gold jewelry made with cubic Zircona from Swarovski.

Kundan Group is also involved in energy, precious metal minting, beauty and personal care, petrochemicals, bullion, and timber verticals.

Digital Gold

In sync with latest trends and technology, Kundan Gold now introduces its very own new age Digital Gold and; Silver Platform – MyGoldKart.

MGK is strategically curated to provide its customers an easy to navigate interface, and essentially act as a personal investment planner that allows its customers to analyse the markets, view real time rates of gold and silver and make short-term or long-term investments in gold and silver at the tap of their finger on a single platform.

Energy

The Kundan Group is on its way to becoming India's leading Renewal Company. The group is committed to transforming renewable energy from real-time energy to a dispatch-able and controlled medium. Our core belief is in sustainability both operationally and environmentally.

Awards 

Promising Bullion Refinery of the Year Award (2015) by Indian International Gold Convention
Promising Non PSU Nominated Agency (2016) by Indian International Gold Convention
Promising Gold Refiner of the Year (2017) by Indian International Gold Convention
Best Refiner & Leading Bullion Award (2018) by India International Gold Convention
Best Bullion Dealer Gold Award (2019) by India Bullion and Jewellers Association Ltd.
Best Refiner and Leading Bullion Seller Award (2019) by Indian International Gold Convention
Best Refiner (Privately Owned) of the Year (2018 & 2019) by Indian International Gold Convention

References

External links 

Indian companies established in 1971
Companies based in New Delhi